Tujhe Nahin Chhodunga is a 1989 Bollywood film produced by Abdul Sattar Khan, directed by Iqbal Khan, starring Akbar Khan, Shekhar Suman, Swapna, Suresh Oberoi, Shafi Inamdar, Amrish Puri and Zeenat Aman.

Music
Lyrics: Hasan Kamal

"Aaj Saqi Tere Maikade Mein" - Amit Kumar, Mohammed Aziz, Anuradha Paudwal, Alka Yagnik
"Bam Chik bam" - Alka Yagnik, Amit Kumar
"Dhalke Chunariya Re" - Shabbir Kumar, Asha Bhosle
"TUmse Nazar Milake" - Alka Yagnik
"Hum To Bemaut" - Kishore Kumar

External links

1980s Hindi-language films
1989 films
Films scored by C. P. Bhati